The 1971–72 Southern Football League season was the 69th in the history of the league, an English football competition.

At the end of the previous season Division One was split into divisions One North and One South with 14 new clubs joining the league.

Chelmsford City won the championship, winning their third Southern League title, whilst Burton Albion, Kettering Town, Ramsgate Athletic and Waterlooville were all promoted to the Premier Division. Eight Southern League clubs applied to join the Football League at the end of the season, Hereford United was elected in favour of Barrow after a tie in the first vote.

Premier Division
The Premier Division consisted of 22 clubs, including 18 clubs from the previous season and four new clubs, promoted from Division One:
Folkestone
Gravesend & Northfleet
Guildford City
Merthyr Tydfil

League table

Division One North
Division One North consisted of 18 clubs, including eight clubs from the previous season Division One and ten new clubs:
Three clubs relegated from the Premier Division:
Gloucester City
Kettering Town
King's Lynn

Two clubs joined from the Metropolitan League:
Bletchley Town
Bury Town

Two clubs joined from the Midland League:
Ilkeston Town
Lockheed Leamington

Two clubs joined from the West Midlands (Regional) League:
Stourbridge
Wellingborough Town

Plus:
Wealdstone, joined from the Isthmian League

League table

Division One South
Division One South consisted of 16 clubs, including eight clubs from the previous season Division One and eight new clubs:
Three clubs joined from the Hampshire League:
Basingstoke Town
Waterlooville
Winchester City

Two clubs joined from the Metropolitan League:
Metropolitan Police
Woodford Town

Plus:
Andover, joined from the Western League
Ashford Town (Kent), relegated from the Premier Division
Maidstone United, joined from the Isthmian League

At the end of the season Ramsgate Athletic was renamed Ramsgate.

League table

Football League elections
Alongside the four League clubs facing re-election, a total of 12 non-League clubs applied for election, eight of which were Southern League clubs. Three League clubs were re-elected, along with Hereford United who were elected in favour of Barrow after a tie in the first vote.

See also
 Southern Football League
 1971–72 Northern Premier League

References
RSSF – Southern Football League archive

Southern Football League seasons
S